Hans Ritter von Adam, born Hans Adam (24 May 1886 – 15 November 1917), was a Bavarian flying ace in World War I, with 21 victories before being killed in action. He enlisted as an infantry private, and rose through the ranks to be commissioned an officer. His valor earned him his nation's highest awards, including one that posthumously raised him to nobility.

Background
Hans Ritter von Adam was born as Hans Adam on 24 May 1886, in Bayerisch Eisenstein in the Lower Bavaria region of the Kingdom of Bavaria (a town now divided between Germany and the Czech Republic), son of a railway official, Andreas Adam, and his wife Hildegard née Fischer. Hans Adam entered the Royal Bavarian Army as a one-year volunteer (Einjährige-Freiwilliger) on 1 October 1906, serving in the 4th Infantry Regiment in Metz. He then became a businessman in Munich. By the time World War I began, Adam was married, with two children.

Military service

Adam returned to service as a lieutenant in the Bavarian Landwehr (Leutnant der Landwehr) when World War I began. He was assigned to the Bavarian 15th Reserve Infantry Regiment. He fought in the Battle of the Frontiers and while fighting around the French fortifications in the Nancy-Épinal region was wounded in action on 2 September 1914.

After recuperating, he returned to the front in late 1915, but then chose to enter pilot training (despite his age, which made him much older than most pilot trainees). He received his Observer's Badge on 15 May 1916 and began service as an aerial observer. He flew as an observer for Eduard Ritter von Schleich.

On 2 March 1917, he joined Jasta 34 and scored his first three victories in an Albatros D.III. He then transferred to Jasta 6 when Oberleutnant Eduard Ritter von Dostler took command. On 12 July 1917 he shot down and killed ace Lt. A.W.B. Miller (6 victories) of No. 29 Squadron RFC for his fifth victory. Adam continued to score, totaling 12 confirmed victories by the end of August. He rose to become Staffelführer of Jasta 6 on 30 August 1917, after Dostler was shot down. Adam scored again the following day, then ran off seven more victories in September. He scored his 21st and final victory on 6 November 1917.

Death
Adam was shot down and killed on 15 November 1917 near Langemarck in his Albatros D.V. He was fighting enemy aircraft from both No. 29 Squadron RFC and No. 45 Squadron RFC; Captain Kenneth Barbour Montgomery of No.45 Squadron, Royal Flying Corps was the apparent victor.

By the time of his death, Adam had already won the Iron Cross First Class and the Military Merit Order of Bavaria. However, posthumous awards continued. On 2 February 1918, Adam received the Knight's Cross with Swords of the Royal House Order of Hohenzollern. On 20 May 1919, Bavaria's highest military decoration, the Military Order of Max Joseph (Militär-Max-Joseph-Orden), was posthumously bestowed on him, with effect from 28 July 1917. On that date, as deputy Staffelführer of Jasta 6, while his Staffelführer chased one bomber, Adam had attacked and broken up the rest of a formation of enemy bombers, and continued the pursuit despite damage to his own aircraft, until his squadron had destroyed the enemy formation. For a commoner, award of the Military Order of Max Joseph carried with it a patent of non-hereditary nobility signified by the title "Ritter von", and Hans Adam posthumously became Hans Ritter von Adam.

Hans Ritter von Adam was interred in the Waldfriedhof in Munich, Germany.

Decorations
 Iron Cross, 1st and 2nd Class
 Knight's Cross of the Military Order of Max Joseph
 Knight's Cross with Swords of the Royal House Order of Hohenzollern
 Military Merit Order

Endnotes

Reference

 Norman Franks; Frank W. Bailey; Russell Guest. Above the Lines: The Aces and Fighter Units of the German Air Service, Naval Air Service and Flanders Marine Corps, 1914–1918. Norman Franks, Frank W. Bailey, Russell Guest. Grub Street, Oxford, 1993. , .

Further reading
 Bayerisches Kriegsarchiv: "Bayerns Goldenes Ehrenbuch", gewidmet den Inhabern der höchsten bayerischen Kriegs-auszeichnungen aus dem Weltkrieg 1914/18, München 1928 (Bavarian War Archives: "Bavaria's Golden Book of Honor", dedicated to the holders of the highest Bavarian war decorations of the World War 1914-18, Munich, 1928). Includes the citation for Hans Ritter von Adam's award.
 Rudolf von Kramer, Otto Freiherr von Waldenfels und Dr. Günther Freiherr von Pechmann: Virtuti Pro Patria: Der königlich bayerische Militär-Max-Joseph-Orden, München 1966 (Rudolf von Kramer, Otto Freiherr von Waldenfels & Dr. Günther Freiherr von Pechmann: Virtuti Pro Patria: The Royal Bavarian Military Order of Max Joseph, Munich, 1966).  Includes a biography of Hans Ritter von Adam.

1886 births
1917 deaths
Aviators killed by being shot down
German military personnel killed in World War I
German World War I flying aces
Knights of the Military Order of Max Joseph
Military personnel of Bavaria
People from the Kingdom of Bavaria
People from Regen (district)
Recipients of the Military Merit Order (Bavaria)